Petrophila avernalis is a moth in the family Crambidae. It was described by Augustus Radcliffe Grote in 1878. It is found in North America, where it has been recorded from Arizona, Colorado, New Mexico, South Dakota and Wyoming.

Adults have been recorded on wing from June to September.

References

Petrophila
Moths described in 1878